Mun Tsai Tong or Moon Tsai Tong was a harbour located between northeast Tsing Yi Island and Nga Ying Chau in Hong Kong. It was reclaimed for the development of a new town on Tsing Yi Island in 1980s. The harbour became two public housing estates, Cheung On Estate and Cheung Fat Estate.

The harbour once protected the boats of fishermen and boat-people that were affected by the reclamation of Tsuen Wan and Kwai Chung areas. They were forced to leave again when reclamation on the harbour started. CARE and Caritas Hong Kong built homes for them in the nearby hill, namely Tsing Yi Fishermen Village and St. Paul's Village. Tsing Yi Fishermen's Children's School was established by the Fish Marketing Organisation above the hill nearby on the Tsing Yi Island.

Ports and harbours of Hong Kong
Tsing Yi